Ramphocelus is a Neotropical genus of birds of the tanager family. They have enlarged shiny whitish or bluish-grey lower mandibles, which are pointed upwards in display. However, this is greatly reduced in the females of most species. Males are black and red, orange or yellow, while females resemble a duller version of the males, or are brownish or greyish combined with dull red, orange or yellowish.

Ramphocelus tanagers are found in semi-open areas. The nest is a cup built by the female of plant materials such as moss, rootlets, and strips of large leaves like banana or Heliconia, and is often in a fairly open site in a tree.  The female usually lays pale blue eggs, with grey, brown or lavender spots, and the young stay in the nest for only about 12 days.

The songs of this genus are repetitions of rich one- or two-syllable whistles.

Ramphocelus tanagers hunt at forest edges or in second growth, taking insects in flight or picking them from leaves.

Taxonomy
The genus Ramphocelus was introduced by the French zoologist Anselme Gaëtan Desmarest in 1805. The name combines the Ancient Greek words  "bill" and  "concave". The type species was designated as the Brazilian tanager by the English zoologist George Robert Gray in 1855.

The other species form two superspecies. One includes crimson-backed, Huallaga, silver-beaked and Brazilian tanagers, and the other comprises Passerini's, Cherrie's and flame-rumped tanagers.

The subspecies icteronotus of the flame-rumped tanager is sometimes considered a separate species, and the lemon-rumped tanager, R. icteronotus, and Passerini's and Cherrie's tanager were formerly lumped as scarlet-rumped tanager, R. passerinii (a treatment some authorities still prefer).

Species in taxonomic order
The genus contains nine species:

References

Sources

 Hilty,  Birds of Venezuela, 
 Morton, Isler & Isler, Tanagers 
 Stiles and Skutch,  A guide to the birds of Costa Rica  
 
 

 
Bird genera